Leucosyrinx is a genus of sea snails, marine gastropod mollusks in the family Pseudomelatomidae.

Description
(Original description) The thin shell is white or pale without color pattern. The anal notch lies behind the periphery or at the suture. The sculpture is delicate and consists of spiral keels or threads and often oblique riblets on the shoulder of the whorls. The  peripheral keel, if present, is not recurved. The operculum is thin, nucleus apical, scar of attachment small. The larval shell is glassy, rounded or keeled. The other shell characters are as in Pleurotoma. The species type is Pleurotoma verrillii Dall.

This group is intended to contain the operculated species of Pleurotomida which are so characteristic of the archibenthal region. They are distinctly contrasted with the coarse, spotted or maculated shallow-water species of Pleuroma proper, by their thin, white, delicately sculptured shells. They are apart from Drillia by having no subtubular projection of the anal notch when adult and no thick varix to mark their maturity. They are separable from the archibenthal Drillias also by their larger shells, longer siphonal canal, and more inflated habit. The anal notch is generally wider, more rounded and nearer the suture than in the typical Pleurotoma, and the operculum proportionally wider and more delicate.

Species
Species within the genus Leucosyrinx include:

 Leucosyrinx amycus W.H. Dall, 1919 
 Leucosyrinx barashi Nordsieck, 1982
 Leucosyrinx bolbodes (Watson, 1881)
 Leucosyrinx caecilia Thiele, 1925
 Leucosyrinx canyonensis (Dell, 1956)
 † Leucosyrinx chloris Olsson, 1922 
 Leucosyrinx claviforma (Kosuge, 1992)
 † Leucosyrinx climoi Maxwell, 1988 
 Leucosyrinx clionella Dall, 1908
 Leucosyrinx elsa Thiele, 1925
 Leucosyrinx equatorialis (Dall, 1919)
 Leucosyrinx eremita (Murdoch & Suter, 1906)
 Leucosyrinx erna Thiele, 1925
 Leucosyrinx esilda (Dall, 1908)
 Leucosyrinx exulans (Dall, 1890)
 † Leucosyrinx fijiensis Ladd, 1982
 Leucosyrinx hemimeres (Watson, 1881)
 Leucosyrinx herilda (Dall, 1908)
 † Leucosyrinx iwaensis MacNeil, 1960 
 Leucosyrinx julia Thiele, 1925
 Leucosyrinx kantori McLean, 1995
 Leucosyrinx lancea Lee, 2001
 Leucosyrinx luzonica (Powell, 1969)
 Leucosyrinx macrobertsoni Powell, 1958 
 † Leucosyrinx nicoya Olsson, 1942 
 Leucosyrinx pelagia (Dall, 1881)
 Leucosyrinx pikei (Dell, 1963)
 Leucosyrinx plebeia (Watson, 1881)
 † Leucosyrinx rabbidgei Ladd, 1982
 † Leucosyrinx rugata (Conrad, 1862) 
 Leucosyrinx sansibarica Thiele, 1925
 Leucosyrinx subgrundifera (Dall, 1888)
 Leucosyrinx taludana Castellanos & Landoni, 1993
 Leucosyrinx turritus Sysoev, 1990
 Leucosyrinx verrillii (Dall, 1881)
 † Leucosyrinx xenica Woodring, 1970 

Species brought into synonymy
 Leucosyrinx angusteplicata (Strebel, 1905): synonym of Antarctospira angusteplicata (Strebel, 1905)
 Leucosyrinx (Sibogasyrinx) archibenthalis Powell, 1969 : synonym of Sibogasyrinx archibenthalis (Powell, 1969) (basionym)
 Leucosyrinx aequatorialis Thiele, 1925: synonym of Comitas aequatorialis (Thiele, 1925)
 † Leucosyrinx alta (Harris, 1897): synonym of † Parasyrinx alta (Harris, 1897) 
 Leucosyrinx angustiplicata (Strebel, 1905): synonym of Leucosyrinx angusteplicata (Strebel, 1905)
 Leucosyrinx archibenthalis Powell, 1969: synonym of Sibogasyrinx archibenthalis (Powell, 1969) (original combination)
 Leucosyrinx badenpowelli Dell, 1990: synonym of Antarctospira badenpowelli (Dell, 1990) 
 Leucosyrinx circinata Dall, 1873: synonym of Aforia circinata (Dall, 1873)
 Leucosyrinx circumcinctum Locard, 1897: synonym of Borsonia hirondelleae (Dautzenberg, 1891)
 Leucosyrinx cuvierensis Mestayer, 1919: synonym of Terefundus cuvierensis (Mestayer, 1919)
 Leucosyrinx dalli (Bush, 1893): synonym of Corinnaeturris leucomata (Dall, 1881)
 Leucosyrinx erica Thiele, 1925: synonym of Comitas erica (Thiele, 1925)
 Leucosyrinx erosina Dall, 1908: synonym of Borsonella erosina (Dall, 1908)
 Leucosyrinx erranea (Locard, 1897): synonym of Borsonia hirondelleae (Dautzenberg, 1891)
 Leucosyrinx falklandica Powell, 1951: synonym of Antarctospira falklandica (Powell, 1951) (original combination)
 Leucosyrinx galapagana Dall, 1919: synonym of Exilia cortezi (Dall, 1908)
 Leucosyrinx goodei Dall, 1890: synonym of Aforia goodei (Dall, 1890)
 Leucosyrinx gradata Thiele, 1925: synonym of Leucosyrinx verrillii (Dall, 1881)
 Leucosyrinx janetae Bartsch, 1934: synonym of Leucosyrinx verrillii (Dall, 1881)
 Leucosyrinx kincaidi Dall, 1919: synonym of Aforia kincaidi (Dall, 1919)
 Leucosyrinx macroberstoni Powell, 1958: synonym of Leucosyrinx macrobertsoni Powell, 1958 (misspelling)
 Leucosyrinx mai Li & Li, 2008: synonym of Comispira mai (B.-Q. Li & X.-Z. Li, 2008) (original combination)
 Leucosyrinx mawsoni Powell, 1958: synonym of Antarctospira mawsoni (Powell, 1958) (original combination)
 Leucosyrinx minatoensis Otuka, 1959: synonym of Aforia circinata (Dall, 1873)
 Leucosyrinx otohimei Ozaki, 1958: synonym of Aforia circinata (Dall, 1873)
 Leucosyrinx pacifica Dall, 1908: synonym of Belomitra pacifica (Dall, 1908)
 Leucosyrinx paragenota Powell, 1951: synonym of Antarctospira paragenota (Powell, 1951)
 Leucosyrinx paratenoceras Powell, 1951: synonym of Typhlodaphne paratenoceras (Powell, 1951) (original combination)
 Leucosyrinx persimilis (Dall, 1890): synonym of Aforia persimilis (Dall, 1890)
 Leucosyrinx pyramidalis (Schepman, 1913): synonym of Sibogasyrinx pyramidalis (Schepman, 1913)
 Leucosyrinx queenslandica Powell, 1969: synonym of Zemacies queenslandica (Powell, 1969)
 Leucosyrinx recta Hedley, 1903: synonym of Austrocarina recta (Hedley, 1903)
 Leucosyrinx sigsbeei (Dall, 1881): synonym of Leucosyrinx verrillii (Dall, 1881)
 † Leucosyrinx subaltus P. Marshall & Murdoch, 1919: synonym of † Parasyrinx subalta (P. Marshall & R. Murdoch, 1919)
 Leucosyrinx tenoceras (Dall, 1889): synonym of Leucosyrinx verrillii (Dall, 1881)
 Leucosyrinx thomsoni Mestayer, 1919: synonym of Taranis nexilis bicarinata (Suter, 1915)

References

 
 Powell A. W. B., New Zealand Mollusca, William Collins Publishers Ltd, Auckland, New Zealand 1979

External links
 
 Bouchet, P.; Kantor, Y. I.; Sysoev, A.; Puillandre, N. (2011). A new operational classification of the Conoidea (Gastropoda). Journal of Molluscan Studies. 77(3): 273-308
 Worldwide Mollusc Species Data Base: Pseudomelatomidae

 
Pseudomelatomidae
Gastropod genera